Simon Charles Boyanus (8 July 1871 – 19 July 1952) was a Russian phonetician who worked in England.

Life
Boyanus was born in 1871 in Moscow. Simon's father was Karl Karlovich Boyanus, a famous homeopathic doctor, German by origin. Simon received his primary education at home, studying English with a tutor. He went to university at St Petersburg where he graduated from the history and philology department. After university he graduated from the State Courses of Dramatic Art in Moscow and under the pseudonym Bronevsky worked in the capital's theaters as a director and actor.
In 1916 he taught English at the Women's Pedagogical Institute, from 1918 at the Second Petrograd Pedagogical Institute. From 1920, he taught courses on theater history at the State Institute of Art History. From 1923 he was an employee of the Institute for the Comparative History of Literature and Languages of the West and the East, after the liquidation of the Faculty of History and Linguistics, Leningrad State University.
In 1934-1937 he was on a business trip in England, working on an edition of the English-Russian dictionary which he had compiled earlier. He never returned to the USSR. He worked at the School of Slavic Studies at the University of London. In 1942 he opened his own school of the Russian language.

Boyanus studied with the Russian linguist and lexicographer Lev Shcherba and they created the Institute of Phonetics and the Phonetic School.

In October 1923 he made a brief visit to the UK where he gave a talk about "stagery" to King's College's Shakespeare Society, but his primary objective was to study phonetics at University College, London.

Boyanus was a professor of English philology at the University of Leningrad, where he worked with Russian linguist Lev Shcherba. He came to the University College Phonetics Department again in 1925, where he spent eight months learning English phonetics under Lilias Armstrong.

He and Lilias Armstrong were married. on 24 September 1926, although Lilias continued to be called "Miss Armstrong" professionally after marriage.

After his marriage, Boyanus had to return to the Soviet Union for eight years, while Armstrong had to stay in England. While away, Boyanus worked with Vladimir Müller to produce English–Russian and Russian–English dictionaries. Armstrong assisted with the phonetic transcription for the keywords in the English–Russian volume. She was able to visit Boyanus in Leningrad on two occasions, and he was able to briefly return to London in 1928. Boyanus was finally able to permanently move to England in January 1934, whereupon he became a lecturer in Russian and Phonetics at the School of Slavonic and East European Studies at the University of London.

Selected works

Citations

References

Further reading
 
 

1871 births
1952 deaths
20th-century linguists
Academics of University College London
Saint Petersburg State University alumni
Academics from the Russian Empire
Linguists from the Russian Empire
Academics from Moscow
Phoneticians
Soviet emigrants to the United Kingdom
Academic staff of Saint Petersburg State University